Bowenia spectabilis is a species of cycad in the family Stangeriaceae. It is endemic to Queensland, Australia. Its natural habitat is subtropical or tropical moist lowland forests.

Range
Bowenia spectabilis is found in northeastern Queensland from the McIlwraith Range on the Cape York Peninsula south to near Tully. It is a rainforest species, growing close to streams and on sheltered slopes in lowland wet sclerophyll forest, but also at an altitude of up to 700 metres in the Atherton Tableland.

Gallery
The 1889 book 'The Useful Native Plants of Australia' records that the yam-like rhizome is used for food by the Indigenous Australians.

References

External links

spectabilis
Endemic flora of Australia
Cycadophyta of Australia
Flora of Queensland
Least concern flora of Australia
Least concern biota of Queensland
Plants described in 1863
Taxonomy articles created by Polbot
Taxa named by Joseph Dalton Hooker